Marika Louise Hackman (born 17 February 1992) is an English vocalist, multi-instrumentalist and songwriter. She is considered to fall within the alternative and English-folk genres, and is noted for her dark, melancholic lyrics.

Hackman has released a mini-album, That Iron Taste (2013), and four full-length albums: We Slept at Last (2015); I'm Not Your Man (2017); Any Human Friend (2019) and Covers (2020). She has also released four EPs: Free Covers (2012), Sugar Blind (2013), Deaf Heat (2014), and Wonderland (2016).

Early life
Hackman was born in Hampshire, England and raised in Selborne and Devon. Her mother and Finnish father met during their work as animators. Hackman watched little television as a child. She and her older brother, Ben, a dance music producer who releases material under the name "Hackman", were instead encouraged to find other creative outlets. Hackman is a self-taught guitarist and began learning when she was 12. She had lessons in piano from the age of 4, and lessons in the bass guitar and drums from the age of 10.

She received a scholarship to attend Bedales School as a day pupil from ages 11 to 17, where she met and befriended supermodel Cara Delevingne. Together, they formed a short-lived cover band called "The Clementines", with Hackman playing drums and Delevingne playing guitar and singing. Hackman performed at Mulberry's Park Lane launch dinner, celebrating the release of Delevingne's collection in February 2014.

At 18, she moved to Brighton, England, where she studied art foundation for a year and planned on earning a degree in fine arts. Instead, she later chose to pursue music full-time.

Music career

Early career (2012–2013)

Hackman's first release was an EP of covers, which was available for digital download in October 2012. The following February, she released her first mini-album, That Iron Taste, featuring songs of her own composition. The album was released in physical formats and as a digital download. It was produced by alt-J's Charlie Andrew. In 2013, she toured Australia and Europe as an opening act for Laura Marling, to support the release of That Iron Taste. The music video for her song "Cannibal" was filmed at Bedales School in March 2013. She later released two more EPs, Sugar Blind on 9 December 2013 and Deaf Heat on 4 April 2014, via iTunes. Both EPs contain songs written by Hackman as well as one cover song.

Debut album: We Slept at Last (2014–2017)
Hackman began recording her full-length debut album in 2014 with producer Charlie Andrew. She debuted new material from the album, including the songs "Skin" and "Ophelia", while on tour in 2013 with Laura Marling. In late September 2014, the album's title was announced as We Slept at Last and was released on 16 February 2015. The album features 12 new songs written by Hackman and does not feature any material from her previous EPs. Hackman embarked on a headlining solo tour throughout the UK in support of the album in November 2014. The album's lead single, "Drown", premiered in mid-October and was officially released on 8 December 2014. On 17 November 2014, "Drown" was announced as a shortlisted contender for DJ Zane Lowe's "Hottest Record of 2014" on BBC Radio 1. It ranked No. 89 out of 100 songs. She also appeared as a featured vocalist on alt-J's song "Warm Foothills", from their second album "This Is All Yours". On 8 January 2015 she premiered the album's second single, "Animal Fear", for DIY Magazine. On 13 January 2015, "Before I Sleep", another track from her debut album, was streamed exclusively on the website Earmilk, as well as her SoundCloud account. Hackman previewed material from the album in the days leading up to its release. The album is available to stream in its entirely on her official SoundCloud account, and features a distinctive blue colour scheme. The deluxe edition of the album includes all of the songs from Hackman's EPs. "Animal Fear" was released as the album's second single on 16 February 2015, the same day as the release of We Slept at Last.

On 18 February 2015, Hackman played material from her debut album at The Cob Gallery in Camden, London. An art exhibit, featuring the album's artwork of 24 photographs, was displayed during the show. She embarked on a solo headlining tour throughout the UK during March and April 2015. Fenne Lily provided support to Marika during these dates, which were generally well received by the press The tour continued with shows throughout Europe during the spring and summer of 2015.

On 25 June 2015, Laura Marling announced that Hackman and Johnny Flynn would join her on tour for a series of concerts in North America during July and August 2015. The concerts would be Hackman's first time performing material in North America. Hackman's fourth single, "Next Year", was released on 14 August 2015.

The album was generally well-received, with The Guardians review rating it four out of five stars, and calling Hackman's work "superbly understated and atmospheric", noting that the "unsettling quality" was a distinguishing factor.

Second album: I'm Not Your Man (2017)
Hackman signed with Sub Pop for her second album, I'm Not Your Man. "Boyfriend", the first single from the album, debuted on Hackman's VEVO channel on 22 February 2017 in the form of a music video. The album features the London band The Big Moon as backing vocalists and instrumentalists. The cover art was designed by Tristan Pigott.

The album was released 2 June 2017. The Guardians four-star (out of five) review praised Hackman's "sweetly sung cut-glass vocals" and for having "risen from the alt-folk scene". The Observer's review (rating 3/5 stars) called the album "witty, raucous and honest", noting that Hackman, despite a new sound, "keeps the best of her former incarnation", adding to the "balance and variety" of the album. Pitchfork declared the album "bracing" and "darkly funny", "melodically strong" and "full of surprises", giving a rating of 7.5/10.

Third album: Any Human Friend (2019)
On 23 April 2019, Hackman shared a teaser video with the caption "A _ _  H _ _ _ _  F _ _ _ _ _", hinting at the title of her upcoming third album. The following day, she released the lead single, "I'm Not Where You Are". On 22 May, the album's title was revealed to be Any Human Friend, and it was made available to pre-order. It was released on 9 August 2019. The album was produced by Hackman and David Wrench, and significantly features synthesizers. Hackman has described the lyrical content of the album as "quite sexual" and "blunt, but not offensive". She wanted to write about sexuality in a "unifying and sexy" way, in contrast to sexual lyrics that objectify the subject. The second single from the album, "The One", was released on 13 June 2019. Hackman has described it as "probably the poppiest song I’ve ever written".

The Guardian, in a four-star review, observed that, on Hackman's "most accomplished record to date", she "flits between self-reflection and self-loathing" in "glorious songs" characterised by "a general wry frankness". Pitchfork called the album "a singular, extraordinarily horny, and occasionally bleak pop record", about "those quiet moments of reckoning with what it means to be alive, young, and cautiously enamoured of it all", also observing Hackman, with her "coolly unimpressed alto" as "not interested in being coy or mincing words". The Independent's review calls the album "blunt and bold" with a "dark sexual energy" on which "Hackman’s beatific voice sits atop methodically messy instrumentals".

For this album cycle, Hackman toured in the United Kingdom, Europe and the United States.

Fourth album: Covers (2020)
This album of covers was produced during Hackman's time in lockdown during the COVID-19 pandemic, including songs from Beyoncé, The Shins, and Elliott Smith. Released on 13 November 2020, the album was noted by NME in its four-star review to be "intimate and inventive", representing "soothing familiarity with the excitement of the new". Hackman "straddles the line between... well-known tunes and something fresher", the reviewer observing that "the results are gorgeous".She shot the music videos for covers in a disused London Swimming pool.

Personal life
Hackman currently resides in the East End of London. She was in a four-year relationship with musician Amber Bain until 2018.

Discography

Studio albums

Extended plays

Singles

As lead artist

As featured artist

Promotional singles

Guest appearances

Music videos

As lead artist

As featured artist

Guest appearances

Awards and nominations

References

External links
 Website
 Primary Talent Profile
 Sub Pop Records Artist Profile
 Transgressive Records Publishing Profile

1992 births
Living people
English women singer-songwriters
English folk singers
English women guitarists
People educated at Bedales School
English people of Finnish descent
British lesbian musicians
Lesbian singers
English LGBT singers
English LGBT songwriters
Lesbian songwriters
Dirty Hit artists
21st-century English women singers
People from Selborne
20th-century LGBT people
21st-century LGBT people
Virgin EMI Records artists